Piedra del Águila is a second category Municipality and the capital city of Collón Curá Department, located in Neuquén Province, Argentina.

Geography 
Piedra del Águila is located 211 km from Neuquén, the capital city of the province. The town is located near the Limay River, in a chain of hills preceded by a mesa area and a small Mountain range with lakes and stone formations. The vegetation is characterized by small bushes, mostly Juncus.

Economy

Tourism
The major touristic attraction in Piedra del Águila is the fishing in the Limay River, in this track of the river the most common species of fish are the brown trout, the perch and the  rainbow trout.

Power Sources
Due to the powerful stream of the Limay river in the zone there are two important electricity dams in the area, the Pichi Picún Leufú Dam and the Piedra del Águila Dam both provide some towns in the province including Piedra del Águila and some towns in Rio Negro Province.

Culture
According to the historian Gregorio Alvarez, the town was named Piedra del Águila due to the fact that in the zone, eagles used to establish nests.

References

Populated places in Neuquén Province
Cities in Argentina
Neuquén Province
Argentina